The Beech Street Historic District is a large residential historic district on the west side of the Helena section of Helena–West Helena, Arkansas.  The district's spine is Beech Street, extending roughly from Phillips Street in the south to McDonough Street in the north, and widens out to include about three blocks each of College, Poplar, and Columbia Streets at its northern end.  The district has long been a fashionable residential area of Helena, and includes a well-preserved diversity of residential architecture, dating from 1858 to 1935, with the Colonial Revival predominating.  It includes 133 buildings, of which about 80 are historically significant.  These properties are generally set on larger lots with attractive terraced landscaping.

The district was listed on the National Register of Historic Places in 1987; eight properties were previously listed separately.

See also
National Register of Historic Places listings in Phillips County, Arkansas

References

Queen Anne architecture in Arkansas
Colonial Revival architecture in Arkansas
Buildings and structures in Phillips County, Arkansas
Historic districts on the National Register of Historic Places in Arkansas
National Register of Historic Places in Phillips County, Arkansas